Structural model may refer to:

Structural model of the psyche, a Freudian model of psychology
Structural equation modeling, mathematical, statistical and computer algorithm models that fit constructs to data
Structural model (software), a diagram that the describes the static structure of a computer program
Marginal structural model, a class of statistical models used in epidemiology
An approach to credit spread-modelling; see under Merton model.